Ticomán is an archaeological site located in the Gustavo A. Madero municipality in Mexico City. It corresponds to an ancient town of the Pre-Classical Mesoamerican period, whose inhabitants could have been Otomis. It was a contemporary population of Tlatilco, Cuicuilco, El Arbolillo and Zacatenco.

Location
Ticomán was a town located on the northwest bank of the Lake Texcoco. To the north of the site is the Sierra de Guadalupe. Some towns near Ticomán were Tlatilco and Zacatenco. The origin of the name of this town comes from Tepecoma or Tecota, which means handmade hill.

Archaeological data
Ticomán was an agricultural town that accounts for the social processes that preceded the emergence of state organizations in Mesoamerica. The archaeological evidence allows us to observe that the society of Ticomán was stratified, but they were organized in a chiefdom. The site of Ticomán was explored by Franz Boas. The findings have served to construct the chronology of the Valley of Mexico during the Preclassic period.

Typical ceramics from the Ticomán phase have been found in several places in central Mexico, in addition to Ticomán, in Temamatla (Ramírez et al., 2000: 100-118) and the Mezquital Valley (Hernández Reyes, 2004: 158). According to Ramírez et al. (2000: 161), Ticomán phase ceramics is an Otomi pottery. Given its stylistic similarities to the Coyotlatelco ceramics of the Epiclassic period in central Mexico, the latter would also be a pottery of Otomi origin, although it may have been manufactured by peoples of various ethnic identities.

See also
Cerro del Chiquihuite
List of pre-columbian archaeological sites in Mexico City

References
Hernández Reyes, Carlos (2004): «El Preclásico superior en Hidalgo y una hipótesis sobre la cerámica otomí temprana y la coyotlatelco». En Nava L., Fernando (comp.), Otopames. Memoria de primer coloquio. Querétaro 1995. University City: IIA-UNAM.
Ramírez, Felipe, Lorena Gámez, Fernán González and Mari Carmen Serra-Puche (2000). Cerámica de Temamatla. University City: IIA-UNAM.

Otomi settlements
Archaeological sites in Mexico City
Indigenous peoples in Mexico City